In the history of the United States, carpetbagger is a largely historical term used by Southerners to describe opportunistic Northerners who came to the Southern states after the American Civil War, who were perceived to be exploiting the local populace for their own financial, political, and/or social gain. The term broadly included both individuals who sought to promote Republican politics (including the right of African Americans to vote and hold office) and individuals who saw business and political opportunities because of the chaotic state of the local economies following the war. In practice, the term carpetbagger was often applied to any Northerners who were present in the South during the Reconstruction Era (1865–1877). The term is closely associated with "scalawag", a similarly pejorative word used to describe native white Southerners who supported the Republican Party-led Reconstruction.

White Southerners commonly denounced "carpetbaggers" collectively during the post-war years, fearing they would loot and plunder the defeated South and be politically allied with the Radical Republicans. Sixty men from the North, including educated free blacks and slaves who had escaped to the North and returned South after the war, were elected from the South as Republicans to Congress. The majority of Republican governors in the South during Reconstruction were from the North.

Historian Eric Foner argues:

Since the end of the Reconstruction era, the term has been used to denote people who move into a new area for purely economic or political reasons, despite not having ties to that place.

Etymology and definition
The term carpetbagger, used exclusively as a pejorative term, originated from the carpet bags (a form of cheap luggage made from carpet fabric) which many of these newcomers carried. The term came to be associated with opportunism and exploitation by outsiders. The term is now used in the United States to refer to a parachute candidate, that is, an outsider who runs for public office in an area without having lived there for more than a short time, or without having other significant community ties.

According to Oliver Temple Perry in his 1912 book, "Notable men of Tennessee, from 1833 to 1875, Their Times and Their Contemporaries", Tennessee Secretary of State and Radical Republican Andrew J. Fletcher "was one of the first, if not the very first, in the State to denounce the hordes of greedy office-seekers who came from the North in the rear of the army in the closing days of the [U.S. Civil] War" within his June 1867 stump speech that he delivered across Tennessee for the re-election of the disabled Tennessee Governor William G. Brownlow:

"No one more gladly welcomes the Northern man who comes in all sincerity to make a home here, and to become one of our people, than I, but for the adventurer and the office-seeker who comes among us with one dirty shirt and a pair of dirty socks, in an old rusty carpet bag, and before his washing is done becomes a candidate for office, I have no welcome."

This was the origin of the term "carpet bag," and out of it grew the well known term "carpet-bag government."

In the United Kingdom at the end of the 20th century, carpetbagger developed another meaning: in British English it refers to people who join a mutual organization, such as a building society, in order to force it to demutualize, that is, to convert into a joint stock company. Such individuals are seeking personal financial gain through such actions.

Background
The Republican Party in the South comprised three groups after the Civil War, and white Democratic Southerners referred to with two derogatory terms. "Scalawags" were white Southerners who supported the Republican party, "carpetbaggers" were recent arrivals in the region from the North, and freedmen were freed slaves. Although "carpetbagger" and "scalawag" were originally terms of opprobrium, they are now commonly used in the scholarly literature to refer to these classes of people. Politically, the carpetbaggers were usually dominant; they comprised the majority of Republican governors and congressmen. However, the Republican Party inside each state was increasingly torn between the more conservative scalawags on one side and the more Radical carpetbaggers with their black allies on the other. In most cases, the carpetbaggers won out, and many scalawags moved into the conservative or Democratic opposition.

Most of the 430 Republican newspapers in the South were edited by scalawags—20 percent were edited by carpetbaggers.  White businessmen generally boycotted Republican papers, which survived through government patronage.

Reforming impulse
Beginning in 1862, Northern abolitionists moved to areas in the South that had fallen under Union control. Schoolteachers and religious missionaries went to the South to teach the freedmen; some were sponsored by northern churches. Some were abolitionists who sought to continue the struggle for racial equality; they often became agents of the federal Freedmen's Bureau, which started operations in 1865 to assist the vast numbers of recently emancipated slaves. The bureau established schools in rural areas of the South for the purpose of educating the mostly illiterate Black and Poor White population. Other Northerners who moved to the South did so to participate in the profitable business of rebuilding railroads and various other forms of infrastructure that had been previously destroyed during the war.

During the time most blacks were enslaved, many were prohibited from being educated and attaining literacy. Southern states had no public school systems, and upper-class white Southerners either sent their children to private schools (including in England) or hired private tutors.  After the war, hundreds of Northern white women moved South, many to teach the newly freed African-American children. There they joined like-minded Southerners, most of which were employed by the Methodist and Baptist Churches, who spent much of their time teaching and preaching to slave and freedpeople congregations both before and after the Civil War.

Economic motives

Initiatives such as the Southern Homestead Act, Sherman's field orders, and Reconstruction-era legislation by Radical Republicans aimed to strip the land, assets, and voting rights of Southerners believed, without evidence, to have supported the Confederates during the war. Although the stated purpose of these initiatives was to empower freedmen politically and economically, many carpetbaggers were businessmen who purchased or leased plantations. They became wealthy landowners, hiring freedmen and white Southerners to do the labor through the development of sharecropping. 

Carpetbaggers also established banks and retail businesses. Most were former Union soldiers eager to invest their savings and energy in this promising new frontier, and civilians lured south by press reports of "the fabulous sums of money to be made in the South in raising cotton." Foner notes that "joined with the quest for profit, however, was a reforming spirit, a vision of themselves as agents of sectional reconciliation and the South's "economic regeneration." Accustomed to viewing Southerners—black and white—as devoid of economic initiative, the "Puritan work ethic", and self-discipline, they believed that only "Northern capital and energy" could bring "the blessings of a free labor system to the region."

Carpetbaggers tended to be well educated and middle class in origin. Some had been lawyers, businessmen, and newspaper editors. The majority (including 52 of the 60 who served in Congress during Reconstruction) were veterans of the Union Army.

Leading "black carpetbaggers" believed the interests of capital and labor were identical, and that the freedmen were entitled to little more than an "honest chance in the race of life."

Many Northern and Southern Republicans shared a modernizing vision of upgrading the Southern economy and society, one that would replace the inefficient Southern plantation regime with railroads, factories, and more efficient farming. They actively promoted public schooling and created numerous colleges and universities. The Northerners were especially successful in taking control of Southern railroads, aided by state legislatures. In 1870, Northerners controlled 21% of the South's railroads (by mileage); 19% of the directors were from the North. By 1890, they controlled 88% of the mileage; 47% of the directors were from the North.

Prominent examples in state politics

Mississippi
Union General Adelbert Ames, a native of Maine, was appointed military governor and later was elected as Republican governor of Mississippi during the Reconstruction era. Ames tried unsuccessfully to ensure equal rights for black Mississippians. His political battles with the Southerners and African Americans ripped apart his party.

The "Black and Tan" (biracial) constitutional convention in Mississippi in 1868 included 30 white Southerners, 17 Southern freedmen and 24 non-southerners, nearly all of whom were veterans of the Union Army. They included four men who had lived in the South before the war, two of whom had served in the Confederate States Army. Among the more prominent were Gen. Beroth B. Eggleston, a native of New York; Col. A. T. Morgan, of the Second Wisconsin Volunteers; Gen. W. S. Barry, former commander of a Colored regiment raised in Kentucky; an Illinois general and lawyer who graduated from Knox College; Maj. W. H. Gibbs, of the Fifteenth Illinois infantry; Judge W. B. Cunningham, of Pennsylvania; and Cap. E. J. Castello, of the Seventh Missouri infantry. They were among the founders of the Republican party in Mississippi.

They were prominent in the politics of the state until 1875, but nearly all left Mississippi in 1875 to 1876 under pressure from the Red Shirts and White Liners. These white paramilitary organizations, described as "the military arm of the Democratic Party", worked openly to violently overthrow Republican rule, using intimidation and assassination to turn Republicans out of office and suppress freedmen's voting. Mississippi Representative Wiley P. Harris, a Democrat, stated in 1875:
If any two hundred Southern men backed by a Federal administration should go to Indianapolis, turn out the Indiana people, take possession of all the seats of power, honor, and profit, denounce the people at large as assassins and barbarians, introduce corruption in all the branches of the public administration, make government a curse instead of a blessing, league with the most ignorant class of society to make war on the enlightened, intelligent, and virtuous, what kind of social relations would such a state of things beget.

Albert T. Morgan, the Republican sheriff of Yazoo, Mississippi, received a brief flurry of national attention when insurgent white Democrats took over the county government and forced him to flee. He later wrote Yazoo; Or, on the Picket Line of Freedom in the South (1884).

On November 6, 1875, Hiram Revels, a Mississippi Republican and the first African-American U.S. Senator, wrote a letter to U.S. President Ulysses S. Grant that was widely reprinted. Revels denounced Ames and Northerners for manipulating the Black vote for personal benefit, and for keeping alive wartime hatreds:

Elza Jeffords, a lawyer from Portsmouth, Ohio who fought with the Army of the Tennessee, remained in Mississippi after the conclusion of the Civil War. He was the last Republican to represent that state in the U.S. House of Representatives, having served from 1883 to 1885. He died in Vicksburg sixteen days after he left Congress. The next Republican congressman from the state was not elected until eighty years later in 1964: Prentiss Walker of Mize in Smith County, who served a single term from 1965 to 1967.

North Carolina
Corruption was a charge made by Democrats in North Carolina against the Republicans, notes the historian Paul Escott, "because its truth was apparent." The historians Eric Foner and W. E. B. Du Bois have noted that Democrats as well as Republicans received bribes and participated in decisions about the railroads. General Milton S. Littlefield was dubbed the "Prince of Carpetbaggers", and bought votes in the legislature "to support grandiose and fraudulent railroad schemes". Escott concludes that some Democrats were involved, but Republicans "bore the main responsibility for the issue of $28 million in state bonds for railroads and the accompanying corruption. This sum, enormous for the time, aroused great concern." Foner says Littlefield disbursed $200,000 (bribes) to win support in the legislature for state money for his railroads, and Democrats as well as Republicans were guilty of taking the bribes and making the decisions on the railroad. North Carolina Democrats condemned the legislature's "depraved villains, who take bribes every day"; one local Republican officeholder complained, "I deeply regret the course of some of our friends in the Legislature as well as out of it in regard to financial matters, it is very embarrassing indeed."

Escott notes that extravagance and corruption increased taxes and the costs of government in a state that had always favored low expenditure. The context was that a planter elite kept taxes low because it benefited them. They used their money toward private ends rather than public investment. None of the states had established public school systems before the Reconstruction state legislatures created them, and they had systematically underinvested in infrastructure such as roads and railroads. Planters whose properties occupied prime riverfront locations relied on river transportation, but smaller farmers in the backcountry suffered.

Escott claimed, "Some money went to very worthy causes—the 1869 legislature, for example, passed a school law that began the rebuilding and expansion of the state's public schools. But far too much was wrongly or unwisely spent" to aid the Republican Party leadership. A Republican county commissioner in Alamance eloquently denounced the situation: "Men are placed in power who instead of carrying out their duties ... form a kind of school for to graduate Rascals. Yes if you will give them a few Dollars they will liern you for an accomplished Rascal. This is in reference to the taxes that are rung from the labouring class of people. Without a speedy reformation I will have to resign my post."

Albion W. Tourgée, formerly of Ohio and a friend of President James A. Garfield, moved to North Carolina, where he practiced as a lawyer and was appointed a judge. He once opined that "Jesus Christ was a carpetbagger." Tourgée later wrote A Fool's Errand, a largely autobiographical novel about an idealistic carpetbagger persecuted by the Ku Klux Klan in North Carolina.

South Carolina
A politician in South Carolina who was called a carpetbagger was Daniel Henry Chamberlain, a New Englander who had served as an officer of a predominantly black regiment of the United States Colored Troops. He was appointed South Carolina's attorney general from 1868 to 1872 and was elected Republican governor from 1874 to 1877. As a result of the national Compromise of 1877, Chamberlain lost his office. He was narrowly re-elected in a campaign marked by egregious voter fraud and violence against freedmen by Democratic Red Shirts, who succeeded in suppressing the black vote in some majority-black counties. While serving in South Carolina, Chamberlain was a strong supporter of Negro rights.

Some historians of the early 1930s, who belonged to the Dunning School that believed that the Reconstruction era was fatally flawed, claimed that Chamberlain was later influenced by Social Darwinism to become a white supremacist. They also wrote that he supported states' rights and laissez-faire in the economy. They portrayed "liberty" in 1896 as the right to rise above the rising tide of equality. Chamberlain was said to justify white supremacy by arguing that, in evolutionary terms, the Negro obviously belonged to an inferior social order.

Charles Woodward Stearns, also from Massachusetts, wrote an account of his experience in South Carolina: The Black Man of the South, and the Rebels: Or, the Characteristics of the Former and the Recent Outrages of the Latter (1873).

Francis Lewis Cardozo, a black minister from New Haven, Connecticut, served as a delegate to South Carolina's 1868 Constitutional Convention.  He made eloquent speeches advocating that the plantations be broken up and distributed among the freedmen.  They wanted their own land to farm and believed they had already paid for land by their years of uncompensated labor and the trials of slavery.

Louisiana
Henry C. Warmoth was the Republican governor of Louisiana from 1868 to 1874.  As governor, Warmoth was plagued by accusations of corruption, which continued to be a matter of controversy long after his death. He was accused of using his position as governor to trade in state bonds for his personal benefit. In addition, the newspaper company which he owned received a contract from the state government. Warmoth supported the franchise for freedmen.

Warmoth struggled to lead the state during the years when the White League, a white Democratic terrorist organization, conducted an open campaign of violence and intimidation against Republicans, including freedmen, with the goals of regaining Democratic power and white supremacy. They pushed Republicans from political positions, were responsible for the Coushatta Massacre, disrupted Republican organizing, and preceded elections with such intimidation and violence that black voting was sharply reduced. Warmoth stayed in Louisiana after Reconstruction, as white Democrats regained political control of the state. He died in 1931 at age 89.

Algernon Sidney Badger, a Boston, Massachusetts native, held various appointed federal positions in New Orleans only under Republican national administrations during and after Reconstruction. He first came to New Orleans with the Union Army in 1863 and never left the area. He is interred there at Metairie Cemetery.

George Luke Smith, a New Hampshire native, served briefly in the U.S. House from Louisiana's 4th congressional district but was unseated in 1874 by the Democrat William M. Levy. He then left Shreveport for Hot Springs, Arkansas.

Alabama
George E. Spencer was a prominent Republican U.S. Senator. His 1872 reelection campaign in Alabama opened him to allegations of "political betrayal of colleagues; manipulation of Federal patronage; embezzlement of public funds; purchase of votes; and intimidation of voters by the presence of Federal troops." He was a major speculator in a distressed financial paper.

Georgia
Tunis Campbell, a black New York businessman, was hired in 1863 by Secretary of War Edwin M. Stanton to help former slaves in Port Royal, South Carolina. When the Civil War ended, Campbell was assigned to the Sea Islands of Georgia, where he engaged in an apparently successful land reform program for the benefit of the freedmen. He eventually became vice-chair of the Georgia Republican Party, a state senator and the head of an African-American militia which he hoped to use against the Ku Klux Klan.

Arkansas
The "Brooks–Baxter War" was a factional dispute, 1872–74 that culminated in an armed confrontation in 1874 between factions of the Arkansas Republican Party over the disputed 1872 election for governor. The victor in the end was the "Minstrel" faction led by carpetbagger Elisha Baxter over the "Brindle Tail" faction led by Joseph Brooks, which included most of the scalawags. The dispute weakened both factions and the entire Republican Party, enabling the sweeping Democratic victory in the 1874 state elections.

William Furbush
William Hines Furbush, born a mixed-race slave in Carroll County, Kentucky in 1839 received part of his education in Ohio. He migrated to Helena, Arkansas in 1862. After returning to Ohio in February 1865, he joined the Forty-second Colored Infantry.

After the war, Furbush migrated to Liberia through the American Colonization Society, where he continued to work as a photographer. He returned to Ohio after 18 months and moved back to Arkansas by 1870. Furbush was elected to two terms in the Arkansas House of Representatives, 1873–74 (from an African-American majority district in the Arkansas Delta, made up of Phillips and Monroe counties.) He served in 1879–80 from the newly established Lee County.

In 1873 the state passed a civil rights law. Furbush and three other black leaders, including the bill's primary sponsor, state senator Richard A. Dawson, sued a Little Rock barkeeper for refusing to serve their group. The suit resulted in the only successful Reconstruction prosecution under the state's civil rights law. In the legislature Furbush worked to create a new county, Lee, from portions of Phillips, Crittenden, Monroe and St. Francis counties in eastern Arkansas, which had a black-majority population.

Following the end of his 1873 legislative term, Furbush was appointed as county sheriff by Republican Governor Elisha Baxter. Furbush twice won reelection as sheriff, serving from 1873 to 1878. During his term, he adopted a policy of "fusion", a post-Reconstruction power-sharing compromise between Populist Democrats and Republicans. Furbush was originally elected as a Republican, but he switched to the Democratic Party at the end of his time as sheriff. Democrats held most of the economic power and cooperating with them could make his future.

In 1878, Furbush was elected again to the Arkansas House. His election is notable because he was elected as a black Democrat during a campaign season notorious for white intimidation of black and Republican voters in black-majority eastern Arkansas. He was the first-known black Democrat elected to the Arkansas General Assembly.

In March 1879 Furbush left Arkansas for Colorado. He returned to Arkansas in 1888, setting up practice as a lawyer. In 1889, he co-founded the African American newspaper National Democrat. He left the state in the 1890s after it disenfranchised black voters. Furbush died in Indiana in 1902 at a veterans' home.

Texas
Carpetbaggers were least numerous in Texas. Republicans controlled the state government from 1867 to January 1874. Only one state official and one justice of the state supreme court were Northerners. About 13% to 21% of district court judges were Northerners, along with about 10% of the delegates who wrote the Reconstruction constitution of 1869. Of the 142 men who served in the 12th Legislature, some 12 to 29 were from the North. At the county level, Northerners made up about 10% of the commissioners, county judges and sheriffs.

George Thompson Ruby, an African American from New York City who grew up in Portland, Maine, worked as a teacher in New Orleans from 1864 until 1866 when he migrated to Texas. There he was assigned to Galveston as an agent and teacher for the Freedmen's Bureau. Active in the Republican Party and elected as a delegate to the state constitutional convention in 1868–1869, Ruby was later elected as a Texas state senator and had wide influence. He supported construction of railroads to support Galveston business. He was instrumental in organizing African-American dockworkers into the Labor Union of Colored Men, to gain them jobs at the docks after 1870. When Democrats regained control of the state government in 1874, Ruby returned to New Orleans, working in journalism. He also became a leader of the Exoduster movement. Blacks from the Deep South migrated to homestead in Kansas in order to escape white supremacist violence and the oppression of segregation.

Historiography

The Dunning school of American historians (1900–1950) espoused White supremacy and viewed "carpetbaggers" unfavorably, arguing that they degraded the political and business culture. The revisionist school in the 1930s called them stooges of Northern business interests. After 1960 the neoabolitionist school emphasized their moral courage.

Modern use

United Kingdom

Building societies

Carpetbagging was used as a term in Great Britain in the late 1990s during the wave of demutualizations of building societies. It indicated members of the public who joined mutual societies with the hope of making a quick profit from the conversion.
Contemporarily speaking, the term carpetbagger refers to roving financial opportunists, often of modest means, who spot investment opportunities and aim to benefit from a set of circumstances to which they are not ordinarily entitled. In recent years the best opportunities for carpetbaggers have come from opening membership accounts at building societies for as little as £100, to qualify for windfalls running into thousands of pounds from the process of conversion and takeover. The influx of such transitory 'token' members as carpetbaggers, took advantage of these nugatory deposit criteria, often to instigate or accelerate the trend towards wholesale demutualization.

Investors in these mutuals would receive shares in the new public companies, usually distributed at a flat rate, thus equally benefiting small and large investors, and providing a broad incentive for members to vote for conversion-advocating leadership candidates. The word was first used in this context in early 1997 by the chief executive of the Woolwich Building Society, who announced the society's conversion with rules removing the most recent new savers' entitlement to potential windfalls and stated in a media interview, "I have no qualms about disenfranchising carpetbaggers."

Between 1997 and 2002, a group of pro-demutualization supporters "Members for Conversion" operated a website, carpetbagger.com, which highlighted the best ways of opening share accounts with UK building societies, and organized demutualization resolutions.

This led many building societies to implement anti-carpetbagging policies, such as not accepting new deposits from customers who lived outside the normal operating area of the society.

The term continues to be used within the co-operative movement to, for example, refer to the demutualization of housing co-ops.

Politics
The term carpetbagger has also been applied to those who join the Labour Party but lack roots in the working class that the party was formed to represent.

World War II
During World War II, the U.S. Office of Strategic Services surreptitiously supplied necessary tools and material to resistance groups in Europe. The OSS called this effort Operation Carpetbagger. The modified B-24 aircraft used for the night-time missions were referred to as "carpetbaggers". (Among other special features, they were painted a non-glossy black to make them less visible to searchlights.) Between January and September 1944, Operation Carpetbagger operated 1,860 sorties between RAF Harrington, England, and various points in occupied Europe. British Agents used this "noise" as cover for their use of Carpetbagger for the nominated Agent who was carrying monies [authentic and counterfeit] to the Underground/Resistance.

Australia
In Australia, "carpetbagger" may refer to unscrupulous dealers and business managers in indigenous Australian art.

The term was also used by John Fahey, a former Premier of New South Wales and federal Liberal finance minister, in the context of shoddy "tradespeople" who travelled to Queensland to take advantage of victims following the 2010–2011 Queensland floods.

United States

In the United States, the common usage, usually derogatory, refers to politicians who move to different states, districts or areas to run for office despite their lack of local ties or familiarity. For example, West Virginia Congressman Alex Mooney was attacked as a carpetbagger when he first ran for Congress in 2014, as he had previously been a Maryland State Senator and Chairman of the Maryland Republican Party. 2022 Republican nominee for Pennsylvania Senator Mehmet Oz was prominently attacked as a carpetbagger by his opponent John Fetterman for previously living in New Jersey until months before the election. Fetterman won the election, with some claiming that this attack was vital to his victory. Hillary Clinton was attacked by opponents as carpetbagging, because she had never resided in New York State or participated in the state's politics before the 2000 Senate race.

The awards season blog of The New York Times is titled "The Carpetbagger".

Cuisine
A carpetbag steak or carpetbagger steak is an end cut of steak that is pocketed and stuffed with oysters, among other ingredients, such as mushrooms, blue cheese, and garlic. The steak is sutured with toothpicks or thread, and is sometimes wrapped in bacon.
The combination of beef and oysters is traditional. The earliest specific reference is in a United States newspaper in 1891. The earliest specific Australian reference is a printed recipe from between 1899 and 1907.

France

Politics 
In French politics, carpetbagging is known as parachutage, which means "parachuting" in French.

See also
 Rootless cosmopolitans

References

Bibliography
 Ash, Stephen V. When the Yankees Came: Conflict and Chaos in the Occupied South, 1861–1865 University of North Carolina Press, 1995.
 Barnes, Kenneth C. Who Killed John Clayton. Duke University Press, 1998; violence in Arkansas.
 Brown, Canter, Jr. "Carpetbagger Intrigues, Black Leadership, and a Southern Loyalist Triumph: Florida's Gubernatorial Election of 1872" Florida Historical Quarterly, 1994 72 (3): 275–301. ISSN 0015-4113. Shows how African Americans joined Redeemers to defeat corrupt carpetbagger running for reelection.
 Bryant, Emma Spaulding. Emma Spaulding Bryant: Civil War Bride, Carpetbagger's Wife, Ardent Feminist; Letters and Diaries, 1860–1900 Fordham University Press, 2004. 503 pp.
 Campbell, Randolph B. "Carpetbagger Rule in Reconstruction Texas: an Enduring Myth." Southwestern Historical Quarterly, 1994 97 (4): 587–596. ISSN 0038-478X
 Candeloro, Dominic. "Louis Post as a Carpetbagger in South Carolina: Reconstruction as a Forerunner of the Progressive Movement". American Journal of Economics and Sociology 34#4 (1975): 423–432.
 Current, Richard Nelson. Those Terrible Carpetbaggers: A Reinterpretation (1988), a favorable view.
 Currie-Mcdaniel, Ruth. Carpetbagger of Conscience: A Biography of John Emory Bryant, Fordham University Press, 1999; religious reformer in South Carolina.
 Davidson, Gienapp, Heyrman, Lytle, Stoff. Nation of Nations: A Concise Narrative of the American Republic. 3rd. New York: McGraw Hill, 2002.
 Durden, Robert Franklin; James Shepherd Pike: Republicanism and the American Negro, 1850–1882 Duke University Press, 1957
 Paul D. Escott; Many Excellent People: Power and Privilege in North Carolina, 1850–1900, University of North Carolina Press, 1985.
 Fleming, Walter L. Documentary History of Reconstruction: Political, Military, Social, Religious, Educational, and Industrial 2 vol 1906. Uses broad collection of primary sources.
 Foner, Eric. Freedom's Lawmakers: A Directory of Black Officeholders During Reconstruction, Oxford University Press, 1993, Revised, 1996, LSU Press.
 Foner, Eric.  (1988). Harper & Row, 1988, recent standard history.
 Fowler, Wilton B. "A Carpetbagger's Conversion to White Supremacy." North Carolina Historical Review, 1966 43 (3): 286–304. ISSN 0029-2494
 Galdieri, Christopher J. 2019. Stranger in a Strange State: The Politics of Carpetbagging from Robert Kennedy to Scott Brown. SUNY Press.
 Garner, James Wilford. Reconstruction in Mississippi (1902)
 
 Harris, William C. The Day of the Carpetbagger: Republican Reconstruction in Mississippi Louisiana State University Press, 1979.
 Harris, William C. "James Lynch: Black Leader in Southern Reconstruction", Historian 1971 34 (1): 40–61. ISSN 0018-2370; Lynch was Mississippi's first African American secretary of state.
 Klein, Maury. "Southern Railroad Leaders, 1865–1893: Identities and Ideologies" Business History Review, 1968 42 (3): 288–310. ISSN 0007-6805 Fulltext in JSTOR.
 Morrow, Ralph E.; Northern Methodism and Reconstruction Michigan State University Press, 1956.
 Olsen, Otto H. Carpetbagger's Crusade: The Life of Albion Winegar Tourgee (1965)
 Post, Louis F. "A 'Carpetbagger' in South Carolina", The Journal of Negro History Vol. 10, No. 1 (Jan. 1925), pp. 10–79 autobiography. in JSTOR
 Prince, K. Stephen. "Legitimacy and Interventionism: Northern Republicans, the 'Terrible Carpetbagger,' and the Retreat from Reconstruction." Journal of the Civil War Era 2#4 (2012): 538-63
 Simkins, Francis Butler, and Robert Hilliard Woody. South Carolina during Reconstruction (1932).
 Tunnell, Ted. Edge of the Sword: The Ordeal of Carpetbagger Marshall H. Twitchell in the Civil War and Reconstruction. LSU Press, 2001, on Louisiana.
 Tunnell, Ted. "Creating 'the Propaganda of History': Southern Editors and the Origins of Carpetbagger and Scalawag", Journal of Southern History, (Nov 2006) 72#4.
 Twitchell, Marshall Harvey. Carpetbagger from Vermont: The Autobiography of Marshall Harvey Twitchell. ed by Ted Tunnell; Louisiana State University Press, 1989. 216 pp.
 Wiggins, Sarah Woolfolk; The Scalawag in Alabama Politics, 1865–1881. University of Alabama Press, 1991
 Wintory, Blake. "William Hines Furbush: African-American Carpetbagger, Republican, Fusionist, and Democrat", Arkansas Historical Quarterly, 2004 63 (2): 107–165. ISSN 0004-1823
 Wintory, Blake. "William Hines Furbush (1839–1902)" Encyclopedia of Arkansas History & Culture (2006).
 Woolfolk, Sarah Van V. "George E. Spencer: a Carpetbagger in Alabama", Alabama Review, 1966 19 (1): 41–52. ISSN 0002-4341

External links

 

Reconstruction Era
American Civil War political groups
Political metaphors referring to people
Pejorative terms for people
Political metaphors